"Smash Clause 28! Fight the Alton Bill!" is a 1988 single from anarcho-punk band Chumbawamba on their Agit Prop Records label. It is a benefit record for the London Lesbian and Gay Switchboard and the Women's Reproductive Rights Campaign.

Clause 28, also known as Section 28, was a controversial bill proposed in the United Kingdom to curtail the promotion or acceptance of homosexuality. The Alton Bill was a set of laws designed to significantly restrict access to abortion in the United Kingdom. As the song titles suggest, the members of Chumbawamba felt strongly that these movements were not in the best interest of the public.

On the record itself the band shout "Clause 29!", which was accurate at the time of recording. Soon after, the bill was changed to Clause 28.

Track listing
 Side A - "Smash Clause 28!"
 Side B - "Fight the Alton Bill!"

Credits
All songs written and produced by Chumbawamba

Chumbawamba on this record are:
Alice Nutter - vocals
Loo - guitar, vocals
Dunst - bass, vocals
Boffo - guitar, vocals
Danbert Nobacon - vocals
Harry Hammer - drums, guitar
Simon Lanzon - keyboards, voice

References

Chumbawamba songs
1988 songs
1988 singles
Agit-Prop Records singles
Abortion in the United Kingdom
Songs about abortion
LGBT-related songs
LGBT law in the United Kingdom
Charity singles